Thomas Karren was born on the Isle of Man, 1 May 1810; died in Lehi, Utah 4 Apr 1876. He joined the Mormon Battalion in 1846 and was honorably discharged in 1847. In 1852 he was among the first LDS missionaries sent to the Sandwich Islands (Hawaii).

References

1810 births
1876 deaths
Karren, Thomas
Karren, Thomas
People from Lehi, Utah